Persiculinae is a taxonomic subfamily of minute to small predatory sea snails, marine gastropod mollusks. This subfamily includes several species which are micromollusks.

Taxonomy
The subfamily is sometimes placed in the family Cystiscidae, and is sometimes instead left in the family Marginellidae the margin snails. It is within the clade Neogastropoda.

(Note: Gastropod taxonomy has been in flux for more than half a century, and this is especially true currently, because of new research in molecular phylogeny. Because of all the ongoing changes, different reliable sources can yield very different classifications.)

In 2019 this subfamily has been classified as a synonym of the subfamily Cystiscinae Stimpson, 1865

Shell description 
The shell minute to large, white, uniformly colored, or patterned; spire immersed or low to tall; lip thickened, smooth or lirate; external varix present or absent; siphonal notch present or absent; weak to distinct posterior notch present; columella multiplicate with combined total of 3 to 13 plications plus parietal lirae; internal whorls cystiscid type.

Description of soft parts
Animal with short to long tentacles, rarely absent; siphon short to long; eyes situated laterally on head slightly below the base of the tentacles; mantle usually not extending over external shell surface.

Internal anatomy
Odontophoral cartilages separate; valve of Leiblein present, with or without bypass tube; esophageal caecum absent; gland of Leiblein short, small, emptying directly into posterior end of esophagus; paired salivary glands  or tubular, attached to esophagus just anterior to the valve of Leiblein, ducts attached to walls of esophagus; single accessory salivary gland present,  or tubular, anal gland absent.

Genera 
 Persicula Schumacher, 1817
 Gibberula Swainson, 1840
 Canalispira Jousseaume, 1875
 Pachybathron Gaskoin, 1853
Genera brought into synonymy
 Baroginella Laseron, 1957: synonym of Canalispira Jousseaume, 1875
 Diluculum Barnard, 1962: synonym of Gibberula Swainson, 1840
 Epiginella Laseron, 1957: synonym of Gibberula Swainson, 1840
 Granula Jousseaume, 1875: synonym of Gibberula Swainson, 1840
 Kogomea Habe, 1951: synonym of Gibberula Swainson, 1840
 Microcassis Paulmier, 1997: synonym of Pachybathron Gaskoin, 1853
 Osvaldoginella Espinosa & Ortea, 1997: synonym of Canalispira Jousseaume, 1875
 Phyloginella Laseron, 1957: synonym of Gibberula Swainson, 1840

Comparative shell anatomy of three genera within this subfamily

References

 Coovert G.A. & Coovert H.K. (1995) Revision of the supraspecific classification of marginelliform gastropods. The Nautilus 109(2-3): 43–110. page(s): 70

Cystiscidae